The European Union of Yoga (EUY) is an international non-profit organisation which co-ordinates a network of yoga teachers, training schools and yoga federations. It was founded in 1971, and has since 1973 held an annual congress at Zinal, Switzerland where yoga teachers and practitioners can meet in a multi-lingual, cross-cultural environment and hear from invited Indian yoga teachers.

History 

The European Union of Yoga (EUY) was founded in 1971 by the entrepreneur Gérard Blitz and the yoga teacher and author André Van Lysebeth, with representatives of National Federations who met in Switzerland to create the European Union of Yoga Federations (UEFNY), which became the EUY in 1975. In 1973, the first UEFNY Congress was held at Blitz's Club Mediterranee in Zinal, Switzerland, at the suggestion of Claude Peltier. The Yoga teacher training program  has a minimum duration of 4 years and a minimum 500 hours of tuition. This must include tutorials with course tutor(s), seminars, and extra-mural courses approved by the Training School.

The multilingual Zinal Congress, attended by hundreds of yoga teachers and practitioners, is held annually. It seeks to network across cultures with invited Indian teachers such as T. K. V. Desikachar, who came to influence the British Wheel of Yoga through the Congress.

Analysis 

The Austrian yoga scholar Karl Baier describes the EUY as an international yoga association representing a secularised variant of the "modern denominational yoga" defined by Elizabeth De Michelis, a category he finds too narrow to be workable. The EUY in his view is not a neo-Hindu faith community, but it does draw on traditional yoga literature from India; postural yoga and meditation are practised, while devotional practices are largely absent.

Member organisations 

The EUY's member organisations are:

 Austria: BYO Berufsverband der Yogalehrenden in Österreich
 Belgium: ABEPY Association Belge des Enseignants et des Pratiquants de Yoga
 FBHY Fédération Belge d'Hébertisme et de Yoga
 YFNB Yoga Federatie van de Nederlandstaligen in België
 Finland: SJL/YFF Yoga Federation of Finland Suomen Joogaliitto ry
 France: FIDHY Fédération Inter-enseignements de Hatha Yoga
 FYT Fédération de Yoga Traditionnels
 IFY Institut Francais De Yoga
 FVI Fédération Viniyoga Internationale
 Germany: BDY Berufsverband der Yogalehrenden in Deutschland
 Ireland: IYA Irish Yoga Association
 Italy: FIY Federazione Italiana Yoga
 FMY Federazione Mediterranea Yoga
 Netherlands: VYN Vereniging Yogadocenten Nederland
 YV Stichting Yoga & Vedanta (associate)
 Portugal: FPY Portuguese Yoga Federation
 Romania: GNSPY Groupe National d’Etude et de Pratique du Yoga
 Slovakia: SYA Slovenska Asciacia Jogy
 YSadhana Federación Nacional de Yoga Sadhana
 Switzerland: SYV Schweizer Yogaverband
 YCH Yoga Schweiz Suisse Svizzera
 Ukraine: UAAY Ukrainian Association Ayurveda-Yoga
 United Kingdom: BWY British Wheel of Yoga

See also 

 Yoga in Sweden

References

External links 

 Official website

Yoga as exercise
Yoga training and certification